The 2017–18 Coupe de France preliminary rounds, overseas departments and territories make up the qualifying competition to decide which teams from the French Overseas Departments and Territories take part in the main competition from the seventh round.

Mayotte

First round 
The matches in Mayotte were played on 18 February 2017. Tiers shown reflect the 2016–17 season.

First round results: Mayotte

Note: Mayotte League structure (no promotion to French League structure):
 Division d'Honneur (DH)
 Division d'Honneur Territoriale (DHT)
 Promotion d'Honneur (PH)

Second round 
These matches were played on 1 April 2017. Tiers shown reflect the 2016–17 season.

Second round results: Mayotte
  

Note: Mayotte League structure (no promotion to French League structure):
 Division d'Honneur (DH)
 Division d'Honneur Territoriale (DHT)
 Promotion d'Honneur (PH)

Third round 
These matches were played on 20 May 2017.

Third round results: Mayotte
  

Note: Mayotte League structure (no promotion to French League structure):

 Division d'Honneur (DH)
 Division d'Honneur Territoriale (DHT)
 Promotion d'Honneur (PH)

Fourth round 
These matches were played on 8 July 2017.

Fourth round results: Mayotte
  

Note: Mayotte League structure (no promotion to French League structure):

 Division d'Honneur (DH)
 Division d'Honneur Territoriale (DHT)
 Promotion d'Honneur (PH)

Fifth round 
These matches were played on 2 September 2017.

Fifth round results: Mayotte
  

Note: Mayotte League structure (no promotion to French League structure):

 Division d'Honneur (DH)
 Division d'Honneur Territoriale (DHT)
 Promotion d'Honneur (PH)

Sixth round 
This match was played on 14 October 2017.

Sixth round Result: Mayotte
  

Note: Mayotte League structure (no promotion to French League structure):

 Division d'Honneur (DH)
 Division d'Honneur Territoriale (DHT)
 Promotion d'Honneur (PH)

Martinique

First round 
This season, the preliminary rounds start with the second round.

These matches were played between 26 and 29 August 2017.

Second round results: Martinique
  

Note: Martinique League structure (no promotion to French League structure):

 Régionale 1 (R1)
 Régionale 2 (R2)
 Régionale 3 (R3)

Second round 
These matches were played on 8, 9 and 10 September 2017.

Third round results: Martinique
  

Note: Martinique League structure (no promotion to French League structure):

 Régionale 1 (R1)
 Régionale 2 (R2)
 Régionale 3 (R3)

Third round 
These matches were played on 23 and 24 September 2017.

Fourth round results: Martinique
  

Note: Martinique League structure (no promotion to French League structure):
 Régionale 1 (R1)
 Régionale 2 (R2)
 Régionale 3 (R3)

Fourth round 
These matches were played on 23 and 24 September 2017.

Fourth round results: Martinique
  

Note: Martinique League structure (no promotion to French League structure):

 Régionale 1 (R1)
 Régionale 2 (R2)
 Régionale 3 (R3)

Fifth round 
These matches were played on 10 and 11 October 2017.

Fifth round results: Martinique
  

Note: Martinique League structure (no promotion to French League structure):
 Régionale 1 (R1)
 Régionale 2 (R2)
 Régionale 3 (R3)

Sixth round 
These matches were played on 20 and 21 October 2017.

Sixth round results: Martinique
  

Note: Martinique League structure (no promotion to French League structure):
 Régionale 1 (R1)
 Régionale 2 (R2)
 Régionale 3 (R3)

Guadeloupe

Second round 
This season, the preliminary rounds start with the second round.

These matches were played between 25 and 27 August 2017.

Second round results: Guadeloupe

Note: Guadeloupe League structure (no promotion to French League structure):
 Ligue Régionale 1 (R1)
 Ligue Régionale 2 (R2)
 Ligue Régionale 3 (R3)

Third round 
These matches were played between 12 and 23 September 2017.

Third round results: Guadeloupe

Note: Guadeloupe League structure (no promotion to French League structure):
 Ligue Régionale 1 (R1)
 Ligue Régionale 2 (R2)
 Ligue Régionale 3 (R3)

Fourth round 
These matches were played between 26 September and 11 October 2017.

Fourth round results: Guadeloupe

Note: Guadeloupe League structure (no promotion to French League structure):
 Ligue Régionale 1 (R1)
 Ligue Régionale 2 (R2)
 Ligue Régionale 3 (R3)

Fifth round 
These matches were played between 11 and 22 October 2017.

Fifth round results: Guadeloupe

Note: Guadeloupe League structure (no promotion to French League structure):
 Ligue Régionale 1 (R1)
 Ligue Régionale 2 (R2)
 Ligue Régionale 3 (R3)

Sixth round 
These matches were played between 18 and 25 October 2017.

Sixth round results: Guadeloupe

Note: Guadeloupe League structure (no promotion to French League structure):
 Ligue Régionale 1 (R1)
 Ligue Régionale 2 (R2)
 Ligue Régionale 3 (R3)

French Guiana

Third round 
This season, the preliminary rounds start with the third round.

These matches were played between 23 August and 2 September 2017.

Third round results: French Guiana

Note: French Guiana League structure (no promotion to French League structure):
 Regional 1 (R1)
 Regional 2 (R2)

Fourth round 
These matches were played between 8 and 12 September 2017.

Fourth round results: French Guiana

Note: French Guiana League structure (no promotion to French League structure):
 Regional 1 (R1)
 Regional 2 (R2)

Fifth round 
These matches were played between 28 and 30 September 2017.

Fifth round results: French Guiana

Note: French Guiana League structure (no promotion to French League structure):
 Regional 1 (R1)
 Regional 2 (R2)

Sixth round 
These matches were played on 13 and 14 October 2017.

Sixth round results: French Guiana

Note: French Guiana League structure (no promotion to French League structure):
 Regional 1 (R1)
 Regional 2 (R2)

Réunion

Third round 
This season, the preliminary rounds start with the third round, equivalent to the 1/8 final of the regional competition, which is divided into two sections.

These matches were played between 7 and 9 July 2017.

Third round results: Réunion

Note: Reúnion League structure (no promotion to French League structure):
 Régionale 1 (R1)
 Régionale 2 (R2)
 D2 Départemental (D2D)

Fourth round 
These matches were played on 16 and 23 August 2017.

Fourth round results: Réunion

Note: Reúnion League structure (no promotion to French League structure):
 Régionale 1 (R1)
 Régionale 2 (R2)
 D2 Départemental (D2D)

Fifth round 
These matches were played on 27 September 2017.

Fifth round results: Réunion

<small>

Note: Reúnion League structure (no promotion to French League structure):
 Régionale 1 (R1)
 Régionale 2 (R2)
 D2 Départemental (D2D)

Sixth round 
These matches were played on 21 and 22 October 2017.

Sixth round results: Réunion

Note: Reúnion League structure (no promotion to French League structure):
 Régionale 1 (R1)
 Régionale 2 (R2)
 D2 Départemental (D2D)

Notes

References 

2017–18 Coupe de France